Miguel Ángel Martínez Torres (born 28 June 1967) is a Spanish former cyclist.

Major results

1986
 1st Clásica de Almería
1988
 1st Memorial Manuel Galera
 2nd Subida a Urkiola
 3rd Clásica a los Puertos de Guadarrama
1990
 1st Prueba Villafranca de Ordizia
 2nd Overall Vuelta a Andalucía
 3rd Trofeo Luis Puig
1992
 1st Overall Vuelta a Andalucía
1993
 1st GP Llodio

Grand Tour general classification results timeline

References

1967 births
Living people
Spanish male cyclists
Sportspeople from the Province of Granada
Cyclists from Andalusia